The Waveland Round Barn was a historic building located near Cushing in rural Ida County, Iowa, United States. Built in 1900, the barn measured  in diameter. It featured red vertical siding, a large central section with a conical roof, a wing section that surrounded the central section with a sectional roof and a hay dormer above the main entrance on the east side. The three-story central section makes this an unusual round barn in Iowa. It was listed on the National Register of Historic Places in 1986. The barn was bulldozed and the remains were burnt in March 2012.

References

Infrastructure completed in 1900
Buildings and structures in Ida County, Iowa
Barns on the National Register of Historic Places in Iowa
Round barns in Iowa
National Register of Historic Places in Ida County, Iowa